Mobaye is a settlement with a population of 7,176 (2003 census) in the Basse-Kotto prefecture of Central African Republic. It lies on the Ubangi River.

History 

On 8 February 2013 Mobaye was captured by Séléka rebels. In September 2019 Mobaye was reportedly under joint control of Anti-balaka and Union for Peace in the Central African Republic. On 4 May 2021 Mobaye was recaptured by government forces.

References

Sub-prefectures of the Central African Republic
Central African Republic–Democratic Republic of the Congo border crossings
Ubangi River
Populated places in Basse-Kotto